Momir is a Serbian masculine given name of Slavic origin. The name may refer to:

Momir Bakrač (born 1957), footballer
Momir Bulatović (born 1956), politician, former president of Montenegro
Momir Ilić (born 1981), Serbian handballer
Momir Karadžić (born 1952), footballer
Momir Kecman (born 1940), wrestler
Momir Milatović (born 1955), basketball coach
Momir Nikolić (born 1955), military commander
Momir of Lučica ( 1804–13), military commander
Momir Petković (born 1953), wrestler, Olympic champion
Momir Rnić (handballer born 1955), Yugoslav handball player
Momir Rnić (handballer born 1987), Serbian handball player
Momir Savić (born 1951), soldier
Momir Talić (1942–2003), general

Slavic masculine given names
Serbian masculine given names